Brian Philley (15 August 1926 – 30 August 2002) is a former Canadian soccer player. He was a two-time national champion with Vancouver City FC (known as Hale-Co FC in 1956) and Westminster Royals FC (1960). He was Canada's starting inside forward or centre forward during FIFA World Cup Qualifiers in 1957. He is an honoured member of the Canada Soccer Hall of Fame.

In the Pacific Coast League, Philley won five championships with three clubs: three times with Vancouver City (1944-45 St. Saviours, 1953–54 City, 1962-63 Canadians), once with St. Andrews FC (1949–50), and once with Westminster (1960–61). He was a regular all-star selection, representing British Columbia or Vancouver in eight of 14 seasons from 1945–46 to 1958–59. He notably scored against Tottenham Hotspur in a 2–0 win in Vancouver on 3 June 1957.

Brian was just 16 years old when he made his Pacific Coast league debut on 20 May 1943, coming in as a substitute and scoring once in St. Andrews FC's 4–5 loss to St. Saviours. Across 20 Pacific Coast League seasons, he scored 114 goals, notably finishing as league runner up in 1948-49 (when he scored a career-high 15 goals) and 1949-50 (13 goals). Over the course of one decade, he was the Pacific Coast league's joint second-highest scorer in the 1950s with 66 goals.

In 1953, he played in a North American championship match on loan with Westminster Royals FC, helping the Canadian club win the Jack Diamond Trophy over the Chicago Falcons.

When he retired from soccer he became a referee and a member of the board of directors of the B.C. Soccer Association.
He was inducted into the B.C. Sports Hall of Fame in 1997.

Honours and achievements

St. Saviours / Vancouver City FC / Hale-Co FC / Canadians
Pacific Coast League winner (1944–45, 1953–54, 1962–63)
Canadian Championship (Challenge Trophy) winner (1956)

St. Andrews FC
Pacific Coast League winner (1949–50)

North Shore United FC
Pacific Coast League winner (1950–51)

Westminster Royals
Canadian Championship (Challenge Trophy) winner (1960)
Pacific Coast League winner (1960–61)

Individual
MVP of the Canadian Championship (Challenge Trophy), 1956
BC Soccer Award of Merit, 1995
British Columbia Sports Hall of Fame (1997)
Canada Soccer Hall of Fame (2003)
Soccer Hall of Fame of British Columbia (2019)

Personal
Brian's brother Pat Philley also played in the Pacific Coast League and was likewise honoured by the Canada Soccer Hall of Fame. While the two brothers often played for different teams, they were both part of Vancouver City's 1953-54 championship team. The brothers also played together for Vancouver St. Andrews FC in 1958, on several provincial all-star teams, and for Canada in 1956 and 1957.

References

External links
 / Canada Soccer Hall of Fame
Canada Soccer Hall of Fame
Canada Soccer Records & Results
Story of the Pacific Coast League

1926 births
2002 deaths
Association football forwards
Canada men's international soccer players
Canada Soccer Hall of Fame inductees
Canadian soccer players
Soccer people from Saskatchewan
Sportspeople from Saskatoon
Vancouver City S.C. players
Vancouver Halecos players